Pedku is a village in Sindhupalchok District in the Bagmati Zone of central Nepal.  it had a population of 2284 and had 408 houses in the village. 
 the population was 1600 (863 females and 737 males) in 391 households.

References

Populated places in Sindhupalchowk District